Paparella is an Italian surname. Notable people with the surname include:

 Joe Paparella (1909–1994), American baseball umpire
 Raffaele Paparella (1915–2001), Italian comic artist and illustrator

Italian-language surnames